Stella Snead (April 2, 1910 – March 18, 2006) was a surrealist painter, photographer, and collage artist born in London, England, who moved to the United States in 1939 to flee World War II. In 1936, Snead enrolled at the Amédée Ozenfant's academy, Ozenfant Academy of Fine Arts in London. In 1939, Snead immigrated to the United States where she met many other surrealist émigrés. In 1940, Snead traveled by bus to Los Angeles where she was inspired by the landscape and indigenous cultures of the American West and Southwest. Snead moved to Taos, New Mexico in 1946 where she lived in an adobe structure. There, she observed American Native processions and dances.

Stella Snead's paintings show her fascination with the "earth's most powerful phenomena, including tornadoes, geysers, and volcanoes," revealed by her "paintings of animals and humans performing ritualistic movements in anthropomorphic landscapes."  One of her better known paintings is Ecstatic Cow (1943). Snead had a solo show in 1941 at Gallery 10 in New York, and shows at Bonestall Gallery in 1945, the Arcade Gallery in London (1945), and at E.L.T. Mesens's London Gallery (1950). In 1949, her work was shown at the Carnegie International Exhibition in Pittsburgh. "Wider recognition returned to Snead in 2005, when her work was included in Surrealism USA, a major exhibition of American Surrealism at the National Academy Museum in New York, followed by subsequent exhibitions at the Wadsworth Atheneum, the Los Angeles County Museum of Art and several important gallery exhibitions of Surrealism."

Snead moved to India in the 1950s where she began working as a photographer. Snead is noted for the eight books of photography she published, including Shiva's Pigeons: An Experience of India (1972), Beach Patterns: The World of Sea and Sand (1975), and Animals in Four Worlds: Sculptures from India (1989). These were based on various extended trips to India in the 1960s, where she shot imagery of Hindu sculpture, Indian nature and street life in India’s urban centers.

Snead spent most of her adult life moving between New York City, London, Taos, New Mexico, and India. In 1971, she settled on the Upper West Side of Manhattan, remaining there until her death. Snead died on March 18, 2006, at the Jewish Home and Hospital in Manhattan, New York. According to Snead’s art dealer Pavel Zoubok, Snead died of natural causes. She left no immediate survivors upon her death.

Early life
Snead was born in London, England on April 2, 1910 to Ethel May Snead and Clarence Fredrick Heron Snead. In her autobiography, Snead claims that her parents' relationship was troubled due to what she deemed “dark moods” exhibited by her father. Such moods were a contributing factor in Stella and Ethel May’s exodus from the family home in 1915. Snead's parents decided Stella would be a life-vegetarian and not properly vaccinated in order not to "contaminate" her blood. Her father began to resent her mother's love, time, and attention she had for her as a child. Her father's meanness towards her mother increased. Her father named Stella Snead Magdalene and registered her as such, but her mother's choice was Stella, which she adopted later on, while Magdalene was used as her middle name.

Snead attended a variety of small village schools in England as a child, before attending a progressive theosophical school, St. Christopher’s, Letchworth. She then took a secretarial course, but never truly employed its benefits, as depressive tendencies kept her from holding a daily work schedule. In 1928, Snead moved from Leicester to Sutton, Surrey. In 1936, Snead joined her only artists friend on the Spanish island of Teneriffe where they painted flowers in a private garden. For the rest of the summer, Snead painted in her bedroom, to her mother's disturbance since she was not exercising and isolating herself from friends.

Painting career

Out of work due to mental illness, Snead’s mother supported her until she became transfixed by the notion of painting in her early twenties. Snead originally became interested in painting after a trip to the Spanish island of Tenerife in the Canary Islands. The friend she traveled with painted in the gardens, and after watching her, Snead was inspired to make her own paintings. After three years of independent study, Snead became a student at the Ozenfant Academy of Fine Art in London, England. She studied there under the renowned French abstract artist Amédée Ozenfant and alongside fellow student and friend Leonora Carrington. After Ozenfant moved to New York to open up the Ozenfant School of Fine Arts in New York, Snead moved to New York in 1939, studying under him until 1941.

The declaration of World War II in Europe spurred Snead’s move from London, England to the United States. In 1939, Snead arrived in New York, but remained only briefly, preferring to travel around the country, often hitching a ride on mail trucks. She lived for several years in Taos, New Mexico.

Starting with garden scenes, Snead progressed toward a surrealist style, and frequently featured nocturnal scenes punctuated by semi-human and mystical creatures. Snead claims to have painted her first Surrealist painting in 1941 for a solo exhibition of her paintings. She did this having known Max Ernst, a prominent Surrealist, would come to her show. In 1942, Snead took a Greyhound bus to Hollywood where she started painting things that she saw around her. Snead first visited Mexico in 1944, to see the newly-erupted volcano, Paracutín, though by this time it was dormant. Snead returned to New York later that year with many paintings. Since 1943, her work had focused on fantasy, with animals represented rather more often than people, for example, The Sulky Lion, which was very two-dimensional, with the background buildings out of scale, and Tiger in the Sky, which was similar, but more three-dimensional.

After her return to London, Snead endured the break-up of a romantic relationship, which triggered the depressive spell that would end her work as a painter until the late 1980s, when she would endeavor to recreate some of her lost works. Many works were lost, stolen or destroyed, and Snead worked to either locate missing works or repaint them from photographs of the works that were taken in the 1940s.

She had her last solo exhibition of paintings in 1950 at The London Gallery in England until 1999's exhibition "Rediscovery: The Paintings of Stella Snead" at CFM Gallery in New York. The catalog for this show had articles by Neil Zukerman, Whitney Chadwick, Saloman Grimberg, Stephen Robeson-Miller and Pavel Zoubok as well as text by Snead and included a comprehensive timeline of her painting career, childhood, and personal struggles. Snead's last painting was done in 1995, which was a postcard that she "surrealized" that she named "Signals from the Grotto." She claimed that she liked that piece better than anything she produced since 1987. The piece was shown at a show arranged by Robert Metzger at the Aldrich Museum, Ridgefield, Connecticut, in December 1985.

Photography career
During Snead’s extensive hiatus from painting, she utilized photography as a creative outlet, photographing the world around her during her travels after World War II.

A large portion of Snead’s photography was inspired by her multiple trips to the Indian subcontinent in the 1960s. Snead lived in India from 1960 until 1971, having moved there after her mother died from a blood clot. Here, her eye for surrealism would manifest in interpretations of Indian monuments and landscapes. Her photography would be published in collections such as Ruins in Jungles (1962), Animals in Four Worlds: Sculptures from India, and Shiva’s Pigeons: an Experience of India. Later, Snead would use some of these photos to create collages, and would publish a collection entitled Can Drowning Be Fun? A Nonsense Book.

In the mid-1950s, Snead's photographic activities took off. Snead learned to print her photographs and began doing her own darkroom work. Snead lived in India from 1960 to 1971, in 1971 she moved back to New York with all her paintings except Rio Grande, which was damaged.

References

1910 births
2006 deaths
20th-century English painters
20th-century English women artists
20th-century women photographers
Artists from London
British emigrants to the United States
English women painters
English women photographers